The third USS Mohican (SP-117), later USS SP-117, was an armed yacht that served in the United States Navy as a patrol vessel from 1917 to 1919.

History
Mohican was designed by St Clare John Byrne, built as the civilian steam yacht SS Norseman and launched in 1890 by Laird Brothers in Birkenhead, Wirral, for Engineer Samuel Radcliffe Platt. When sold by Platt, she was renamed SS Lady Godiva and later when purchased by New Yorker Tracy Dows he named her Mohican.  Oliver and J. Borden Harriman purchased her from Tracy Dows in October 1905.

U.S. Navy
The U.S. Navy acquired Mohican on a free lease from her next owner, Robert Perkins of New York City, on 19 April 1917 for use as a patrol boat during World War I. She was commissioned at New York City on 7 June 1917 as USS Mohican (SP-117).

Mohican was assigned to the 3rd Naval District as guard boat on 1 July 1917. She engaged in patrol and escort duty in New York Harbor and off New York City until 21 August 1918, at times directing the heavy maritime traffic in Lower New York Bay and at others aiding vessels in distress due to fire or collision. Mohican was renamed USS SP-117 in April 1918 to avoid confusion with another Navy ship of the same name, the sloop-of-war .

On 23 August 1918, SP-117 took on board an air observation balloon and aviators and began observation kite balloon duty at the entrance to New York Harbor and Ambrose Channel. She remained on this duty through 25 November 1918 and then, following repairs, departed on 14 December 1918 to assume guard boat and kite balloon duty at Gravesend Bay, Long Island, New York.

Decommissioned
SP-117 ceased operations on 17 January 1919 and on 15 February 1919 was decommissioned at Tebo's Yacht Basin at Brooklyn, New York. The Navy returned her to her owner on 17 February 1919.

References

External links

Department of the Navy Naval Historical Center Online Library of Selected Images: Civilian Ships: Mohican (Steam Yacht, 1890). Previously named Lady Godiva and Norseman. Served as USS Mohican (SP-117) and USS SP-117 in 1917-1919
NavSource Online: Section Patrol Craft Photo Archive: SP-117 ex-Mohican (SP 117)

Patrol vessels of the United States Navy
World War I patrol vessels of the United States
Ships built on the River Mersey
Steam yachts
1890 ships